Richard Edward Roberts was a Welsh professional footballer who played in the Football League for Coventry City as a left back.

Personal life 
Roberts' brothers Hugh and Albert were also footballers.

Career statistics

Honours 
Atherstone Town
 Lady Agnes Durham Cup: 1928–29

References

Date of death missing
Welsh footballers
English Football League players
Association football fullbacks
Coventry City F.C. players
Leeds City F.C. players
Southern Football League players
Nuneaton Borough F.C. players
Atherstone Town F.C. players
1891 births
Sportspeople from Rhyl
Leeds City F.C. wartime guest players